Gairnieston Castle or Garniston Castle was a medieval castle in Aberdeenshire, Scotland.

No traces of it remain.

History

The castle was the seat of the chief of clan Dalgarno.

Structure

The castle stood on the right bank of a stream.  There is a small park which is believed to have been the castle garden.

References

Castles in Aberdeenshire
Former castles in Scotland